Marc Summers (born Marc Berkowitz; November 11, 1951) is an American television personality, comedian, game show host, producer, and talk show host. He is best known for hosting Double Dare for Nickelodeon, and Unwrapped for Food Network; he was the executive producer for both Dinner: Impossible and Restaurant: Impossible also for Food Network.

Early career 
Summers was born Marc Berkowitz in Indianapolis, Indiana, to a Jewish family. He attended Westlane Middle School and North Central High School in Indianapolis and Grahm Junior College in Boston. After consulting with Rabbi Weitzman of Indianapolis Hebrew Congregation about whether to pursue a career as a rabbi or as an entertainer, Rabbi Weitzman told Summers, "As a rabbi, you can help a small congregation a lot, but as a performer you can help a lot of people a little." Summers decided he preferred to help a lot of people, which set his path to becoming a performer. In the beginning of his career he was a radio DJ and a stand-up comedian; although he held various television production jobs before a career boost in 1986, when Nickelodeon hired him as the host of Double Dare. According to Summers, a ventriloquist friend was called for an interview to Double Dare, but having never heard of Nickelodeon, sent Summers for the interview in his place. Summers was the first to interview for the job and was hired as both the host and producer. Double Dare was syndicated within two years and had a brief broadcast network run in prime time as Fox Family Double Dare in 1988. The show's popularity led to other hosting jobs including the syndicated Couch Potatoes in 1989, and Nickelodeon's What Would You Do? in 1991. GSN chose him to host its original program WinTuition in 2002. He also had a rare dramatic performance in the Nickelodeon-produced Halloween program Mystery Magical Special, which also highlighted his skills as a stage magician. Summers also made celebrity guest rounds on other game shows including Scrabble, Super Password, Talk About, Lingo, To Tell the Truth, Win, Lose or Draw, and Hollywood Squares. In 1989, he auditioned to host the CBS daytime version of Wheel of Fortune; however, Bob Goen was hired instead.

In the late 1980s and early 1990s, Summers appeared on television talk shows, including a stint on ABC television's Home Show. After Double Dare's cancellation in 1993, Summers co-hosted Our Home, a daily talk show aimed at homemakers, on Lifetime. Summers left Our Home after a couple of seasons to co-host another Lifetime talk show, Biggers & Summers.

On March 28, 2008, the Communication and Journalism Club of Coastal Carolina University presented Summers with the first annual Peach Cobbler Award, an honor modeled after Harvard's Hasty Pudding Award. The Peach Cobbler Award recognizes an individual and their accomplishments in the communication field. The Communication and Journalism Club also declared that same day as "Marc Summers Day". After the ceremony, Summers hosted a mock version of Double Dare on the university's campus.

Health 
During an interview with Dr. Eric Hollander on Biggers & Summers, Summers revealed that he has obsessive–compulsive disorder. Summers went public about his condition on various television shows, including The Oprah Winfrey Show and Today. In 1999, Summers produced a VHS video box set with Hollander about his experience, called Everything in Its Place: My Trials and Triumphs with Obsessive Compulsive Disorder. Summers also participated in a series of VHS videos for Freedom from Fear, a non-profit organization with the goal of addressing anxiety disorders and other related behavioral disorders. Despite his OCD, he was able to interact fully with his fans and contestants on Double Dare to the point of even allowing himself to get slimed, as well as shaking hands with contestants. Going public with his OCD cost Summers a job as host of a Hollywood Squares revival, and he was replaced by Tom Bergeron.

In August 2012, Summers suffered severe head injuries in an accident in a Philadelphia taxicab equipped with a partition. Summers said, "Everything on the left side [of my face] from my eye socket down was just wiped out. My eye socket got all swollen. I'm having trouble seeing completely out of the left eye ... There's lots of VCR parts in my face. I was pretty lucky that I didn't have brain damage."

In a 2015 interview on the Philadelphia-based Preston & Steve radio show on WMMR, Summers revealed that six years before, in 2009, he had "stomach problems" and had been in a lot of pain. Exploratory surgery revealed that he had chronic lymphatic leukemia. The initial doctor recommended chemotherapy, but fearing the pain and illness involved, Summers sought the opinion of another oncologist in Chicago. The oncologist promptly misdiagnosed him with mantle cell lymphoma and told him that he only had six months to live. Summers went back to his initial doctor in a panic; ultimately the original diagnosis of chronic lymphatic leukemia was confirmed. Chemotherapy would go on for the next two years, which he described as "brutal". On April 10, 2018, Summers was again a guest on Preston & Steve, and discussed flying to the University of Pennsylvania Medical Center from his home in Santa Barbara for further treatment.

In late 2019, in an in-person interview on KTLA's morning show, Summers revealed that he is again battling cancer. He did not volunteer which type of cancer he had, only saying that he was taking medication, and added, "I feel good, it's all going to be fantastic".

Later career 
During the 1990s, Summers continued work on television shows, each with varying success. He created and hosted the short-lived children's game show Pick Your Brain, co-hosted Great Day America on the PAX Network, produced I Can't Believe You Said That, and hosted It's a Surprise on Food Network.

In 1993, Summers hosted a special episode of Nova, called "The NOVA Quiz", celebrating the show's 20th anniversary season on PBS. Contestants answered science questions and participated in science experiments, for a chance to go on a science expedition.

Summers made a memorable appearance on the Tonight Show with Jay Leno on October 17, 1994, where he sat next to Burt Reynolds. The two traded jabs, before Reynolds dumped water from his mug onto Summers' lap; the two ended up pieing each other. Regarding the experience, Summers later recalled: "Burt Reynolds was going through a bad divorce with Loni Anderson. This was not planned, it was all real. Jay called me afterward and asked, 'What's going on between you and Burt?' It was like survival of the fittest. I was a comic. You wait your entire life to get on the Tonight Show, I wasn't going to let this guy fuck it up for me."

Summers returned to Nickelodeon in 2000 as the executive consultant for Double Dare 2000, an updated version of his original show. Two years later, he was the executive producer for another Nickelodeon resurrection, Wild and Crazy Kids.

He returned to television as the host of more shows, including History IQ with his old announcer Harvey on the History Channel; the Food Network series Unwrapped; the Unwrapped spin-off game show, Trivia Unwrapped; and the Game Show Network series WinTuition. In 2005, Summers became the host of Food Network's reality series The Next Food Network Star. Summers joined Chef Guy Fieri as co-host of Food Network's Ultimate Recipe Showdown in 2008. In late 2006, Sony Pictures Television and KingWorld planned a new game show called Combination Lock, with Summers hosting the first pilot. It was to be paired with a revival of the classic game show, The Joker's Wild. However, a deal couldn't be reached by KingWorld and station groups. Off the screen, Summers has been involved as an executive producer on the Food Network's Dinner: Impossible and Restaurant: Impossible. Summers currently splits his time between homes in Los Angeles and Philadelphia where his company Marc Summers Productions has a branch.

Summers has hosted stage versions of The Price Is Right and credits Bob Barker and The Price Is Right for helping him pursue a game-show career. Summers was a young page at CBS when The Price Is Right premiered with The Joker's Wild and Gambit in 1972, and he often asked advice of Barker, Jack Barry and Wink Martindale—the shows' respective hosts—about a hosting career. He claims it's the best possible education and training in the game show field, and it was during this time that Summers got his first on-air experience, as a fill-in announcer on The Joker's Wild.

Summers served as host of "Drunk Double Dare" during Drunk Day, an annual episode of the Philadelphia-based Preston & Steve radio show on WMMR, held directly before the Fourth of July weekend. The show reunited Summers with his Double Dare cohorts Harvey and Robin Marrella. He has also hosted "Dunkel Dare" during the annual Beer Week in Philadelphia, Pennsylvania.

Summers appears in the Good Charlotte music video for their song "Last Night", which uses Family Double Dare as the motif for the video. He has also played himself on The Cleveland Show, Robot Chicken, Workaholics, and Sanjay & Craig, and appeared in special segments on ABC's The Chew.

He is the subject and executive producer of On Your Marc, a documentary that chronicles his life and development of his one-man theater show, featuring interviews with Neil Patrick Harris, Ryan Seacrest, Guy Fieri and Seth Green, and was directed by Mathew Klickstein. He hosted a number of early preview screenings and live events as part of a nationwide promotional tour of the film in October 2017.

Summers returned to host a 30th Anniversary of Double Dare at the 2016 San Diego Comic-Con International. Summers also appeared in a commemorative half-hour special in honor of the show's 30th anniversary that aired on Nickelodeon on November 23, 2016.

In 2018, Summers provided color commentary along with his vast knowledge of the game on the revival of Double Dare with Liza Koshy, produced by RTL Group / FremantleMedia, and served as executive producer. In 2019, Summers hosted Double Dare Live, a non-broadcast, national touring version of the show.

On July 20, 2020, Summers appears as himself on an episode in season four of Nickelodeon's The Loud House aired titled "How Double Dare You!", in which the Loud family siblings attempt to get on Double Dare.

References

External links 

1951 births
Living people
20th-century American comedians
21st-century American comedians
American game show hosts
American male comedians
American male voice actors
American television talk show hosts
Comedians from California
Comedians from Indiana
Food Network
Game show announcers
Male actors from California
Male actors from Indianapolis
Male actors from Los Angeles
People from Los Angeles
People with obsessive–compulsive disorder
Television personalities from California
Television producers from California
Jewish American entertainers